Sam Alan Martin (born 2 February 1989, in Bedford Park, Adelaide, Australia) is a former motorcycle speedway rider from Australia.

Career
Martin began his British league career when he signed for the junior team of the Oxford Cheetahs (or Silver Machine which they were known as that season). The juniors were called the Oxford Silver Machine Academy and competed in the 2004 Speedway Conference League. The following season he rode for Oxford again and won the 2005 Speedway Conference League before joining Boston Barracudas in 2006. He returned to Oxford for 2007.

It was also in 2007 that the Premier League came calling and Martin rode for Berwick Bandits during. the 2007 Premier League speedway season. In 2008, he sealed the final team place with the Sheffield Tigers.

References 

Australian speedway riders
Berwick Bandits riders
Sheffield Tigers riders
Living people
1989 births